The Suebian knot is a historical male hairstyle ascribed to the tribe of the Germanic Suebi. The knot is attested by Tacitus in his 1st century AD work Germania, found on contemporary depictions of Germanic peoples, their art, and bog bodies.

Germania
Roman historian Tacitus reports in Germania (98 CE) that the Suebian warriors combed their hair back or sideways and tied it into a knot, allegedly with the purpose of appearing taller and more awe-inspiring on the battlefield. Tacitus also reports that the fashion had spread to neighboring Germanic tribes among the younger warriors, while among the Suebians, the knot was sported even by old men as a status symbol, which "distinguishes the freeman from the slave", with the most artful knots worn by the most wealthy nobles:

Archaeological record
A number of bog bodies have been found with hair dressed in Suebian knots:

 Osterby Man, 70–220 AD of Osterby near Rendsburg-Eckernförde, Schleswig-Holstein, Germany 
 Dätgen Man, 135–385 AD, of Dätgen, near Rendsburg-Eckernförde, Schleswig-Holstein, Germany

In 2000 at the Baltic Sea coast at Czarnowko near Lębork, Poland, a bronze kettle was found depicting males wearing the Suebian knot hairstyle.

Depictions
Historical depictions are found on the Trajan column, the cauldron of Musov, the Tropaeum Traiani relief, and a bronze sculpture of a kneeling German in the Bibliothèque nationale de France.

Method
The hair is divided at the back in two uniform strands, slicked and laid in opposite directions around the head. On one side of the head, usually in the temporal region, the two strands are individually tightened in the same direction. The two strands are then twisted, whereby the rotation of the two individual strands loosens somewhat.  A loop is formed from the resulting braid and the excess braid end is put in a loop through the loop. By natural untwisting the resulting knot tightens and stops without further aids.

The Osterby Man had male-pattern hair loss and very long and thin hair. Experimental archaeological tests with this hairstyle showed that the Suebian knot holds just as well even with very long and thin hair, as in the bog body.  Some hair grease improves the durability of the hairstyle.

Gallery

See also
Oseledets
Sikha
List of bog bodies
List of hairstyles

References

Germanic paganism
Early Germanic hairstyles
Suebi
Archaeological terminology (Germanic)